The third season of the television drama series Shuga, dubbed Shuga Naija, was first broadcast on MTV Base from December 2013 to January 2014. The season was written by Kemi Adesoye and directed by Biyi Bandele. It starred Tiwa Savage, Chris Attoh, Maria Okanrende, Emmanuel Ikubese, Sharon Ezeamaka, Efa Iwara, Dorcas Shola Fapson, Okezie Morro, Timini Egbuson, Kachi Nnochiri, Sanni Mu'azu and Leonora Okine. Shuga Naija is a multimedia campaign which educates youths on HIV, safe sex and teen pregnancy. It also touches on maternal and child health, family planning, gender-based violence, and women empowerment. The television series, which consists of eight episodes, was shot and set in Lagos State, produced in partnership with the National Agency for the Control of AIDS (NACA).

Premise
Shuga Naija tells the story of different Lagos youths and how they deal with love, sex and relationships. Sophie (Dorcas Shola Fapson) is a campus "RunsGirl", who comes from a poor background and tries to sustain herself by sleeping with rich men; her sister also comes to visit her from the village and tries to adjust oddly to the city environment. Sade (Tiwa Savage) is an over-protective adoptive mother of a son who's HIV positive. Femi (Ikubese Emmanuel) returns from Nairobi and tries to make a fresh start. Ekene (Okezie morro) is a casanova who is a boyfriend to Foye (Maria Okanrende), an on-air personality and disc jockey. Solomon (Sani Mu'azu) is an aristo, who's HIV positive, and sleeps with young girls without protection. Malaika (Leonora Okine) is married to Nii (Chris Attoh), a man who constantly beats and violates her.

Cast

Main characters
Dorcas Shola Fapson as Sophie (8 episodes)
Emmanuel Ikubese as Femi (8 episodes)
Okezie Morro as Ekene (8 episodes)
Maria Okanrende as Foye (8 episodes)
Timini Egbuson as Tobi (8 episodes)
Sharon Ezeamaka as Princess (8 episodes)
Sani Mu'azu as Solomon (8 episodes)
 Chris Attoh as Nii (7 episodes)
Leonora Okine as Malaika (7 episodes)
Olumide Oworu as Weki (6 episodes)

Supporting characters
 Tiwa Savage as Sade Banjo (8 episodes)
Efa Iwara as David (8 episodes)
Kachi Nnochiri as Osaro (8 episodes)
Owumi Ugbeye as Bikiya (6 episodes)
Samuel Ajibola as Chibuzo (1 episode)
 Nick Mutuma as Leo (1 episode)

Guest appearances
KC Ejelonu as HIV Counselor (2 episodes)
Blossom Chukwujekwu as Coach (1 episode)
 Iyanya as Iyanya (1 episode)
 Ice Prince as Ice Prince (1 episode)
 Vector as Vector: Season 4 (1 episode)

Production
In June 2013, It was officially announced that the new seasons of Shuga will now be produced in Nigeria, as the previous seasons had been shot and produced in Kenya. At the unveiling event held at the Wheatbaker Hotel in Lekki on 25 June, it was stated that the new series will have a whole new look; with new predominantly Nigerian cast and crew. Ikubese Emmanuel and Nick Mutuma are the only actors from previous seasons who returned to the new season of the series. Speaking on the transition, Alex Okosi, the Managing Director of Viacom International Media Networks Africa says producing the project in Nigeria will help the realization of the series due to Nigeria's flourishing entertainment industry. According to Business Day, "When it is a Nollywood production it tends to get more recognition and embrace for people, both locally and internationally". The Head writer, Kemi Adesoye comments: "In bringing Shuga to Nigeria, I hope that we embrace it. I hope young people will learn, be entertained and ultimately change their lives. I would like Shuga to help start  conversations between friends and families about issues relating to certain taboos, talk about HIV and about teen pregnancy". Bandele reportedly chose to work with Adesoye after seeing her screenplay for Kunle Afolayan's acclaimed film Phone Swap (2012). 

In August, the cast of Shuga Naija was officially revealed and Tiwa Savage was revealed as one of the main casts in the season; this is Savage's first experience as an actor. Principal photography by Hein de Vos and Adekunle "Nodash" Adejuyigbe also commenced in August 2013; the series was shot mainly in Lagos State. As of September, rapper Ice Prince, musician Iyanya and previous Shuga seasons' actor, Nick Mutuma had also been associated with the project. The public were also allowed to vote for their two bests to be given a role out of six actors posted on Shuga website in August 2013. The season was produced by MTV Staying Alive Foundation, in conjunction with Nigeria's National Agency for the Control of AIDS (NACA), and the Bill & Melinda Gates Foundation. Other aspects introduced in the new season of the Shuga campaign includes: a radio drama series, a peer educator programme, a comic book in hausa and English languages, a mobile information service, campaign on social media and a range of digital platforms.

Music and soundtrack
The title soundtrack, "Sweet Like Shuga" was written and produced by Del B, and performed by Flavour, Sound Sultan, Chidinma, KCee and Professor. The music video for the soundtrack was directed by Clarence Peters; it premiered on MTV Base in mid-November 2013 and was released on YouTube on 4 December. All other songs featured in Shuga Naija, like in the previous seasons, are independently produced.

Track listing

Release
The third season of Shuga premiered on 26 November 2013 at the Silverbird Cinema, Victoria Island, Lagos. A promo trailer was uploaded on YouTube on 27 November, and the show started airing on MTV Base on the 1 December 2013, World AIDS Day; it was subsequently broadcast on other MTV networks, and also available for online streaming via MTV Base' YouTube channel and on iROKOtv. The season was also broadcast by Nigerian terrestrial televisions and other third party television networks around the world. The season was broadcast via a total of 88 television networks, and have reportedly aired to more than 550 million households across the world. Shuga comic book, published by Kachifo Limited, was also launched in January 2014.

Reception
The show was mostly well received by the general audience. Azeezat Fadekemi Sulaiman comments: "All the complexities of relationships are explored in this poignant drama that will force you to confront common preconceptions and prejudice about HIV/AIDS. Cheating,  parenting and adolescence are all delved into in great detail. Shuga, directed by Biyi Bandele is a must watch for every African seeking to understand the intricacies of living with HIV". Bisoye Babalola of YNaija commends the character of Sophie and comments: "Shuga Naija is an educational yet captivating TV programme..... it paints a realistic picture of what situations and problems that young people in Nigeria or around the world encounter. The show is very inspiring and I would recommend it to people of all ages around the globe". Actress Beverly Naya comments: "Bringing Shuga to Nigeria is a very smart move as youths in Nigeria need to take the importance of sexual health seriously and using this medium to push this message as well as using Nigerian acts to create real life situations is a smart move".

Episodes

References

External links
Shuga Naija full episodes
Shuga (season 3) on IMDb

2013 Nigerian television seasons
Television shows set in Lagos